Premolis is a genus of moths in the family Erebidae. The genus was erected by George Hampson in 1901.

Species
Premolis amaryllis
Premolis semirufa

Former species
Premolis excavata
Premolis rhyssa

References

Phaegopterina
Moth genera